SuperDOS or Super DOS may refer to:

 Bluebird SuperDOS, used on some Data General computers
 Technical Support SuperDOS, used on some Atari computers
 Concurrent DOS 286, Digital Research's modular multi-user multitasking operating system since 1985
 FlexOS 286, the Digital Research Concurrent DOS 286 successor since 1986

See also 

 Novell SuperNOS, a never released project to merge NetWare and UnixWare